Michael Darbyshire (15 October 1917 – 20 November 1979) was an English actor of stage and screen.  He is perhaps best known for his role as Hubert Davenport, the Victorian ghost, in the long running BBC TV children's comedy series Rentaghost.

He also played one of the eccentric inventors in the 1968 film Chitty Chitty Bang Bang. On stage, he appeared in the original West End cast of the musical Pickwick in 1963, its Broadway transfer in 1965, and a BBC TV adaptation in 1969.

He was a member of the Players Theatre Company based in London in Villiers Street, appearing regularly and also on many occasions on the BBC TV series The Good Old Days.

Michael Darbyshire died in 1979, aged 62.

Filmography

References

External links

1917 births
1979 deaths
British male stage actors
British male film actors
British male television actors
Place of birth missing
20th-century British male actors